Hooman Majd (born 1957) is an Iranian-born American journalist, author, and political commentator who writes on Iranian affairs. He is based in New York City, and regularly travels to Iran.

Early life
Hooman Majd was born in 1957 in Tehran, Iran. He was raised in a family involved in the diplomatic service, serving under the Shah Mohammad Reza Pahlavi. Majd lived from infancy abroad, mostly in the United States and in England, but attending American schools in varied places, such as Tunis and New Delhi. 

He boarded at St Paul's School, London, until 1974. Followed by attendance to George Washington University (GWU) for electrical engineering in Washington, D.C. and graduated in 1977. He studied operations research at GWU for two more years but did not complete. He stayed in the United States after the 1979 revolution.

Extended family 
Majd's maternal grandfather was the Ayatollah Mohammad Kazem Assar (1885–1975), who was born to an Iraqi mother and an Iranian father. The Ayatollah, along with other contemporary ulema, overcame traditional opposition to serve as a professor of philosophy at the University of Tehran. His own father, whose origins were in the village of Ardakan, Iran, became representative of a "middle class" that was "pro-democratic and pro-modernization".

Madj aunt is musician Shusha Guppy, and his cousin is convicted fraudster Darius Guppy.

Career
He has published three non-fiction books in the United States and in the United Kingdom, which have been translated into a number of other languages, including The Ayatollah Begs to Differ: The Paradox of Modern Iran (New York: Doubleday, 2008); The Ayatollahs' Democracy: An Iranian Challenge (New York: W.W. Norton, 2010); and The Ministry of Guidance Invites You to Not Stay: An American Family in Iran (New York: Doubleday, 2013). He has also published short fiction in collections and in The American Scholar and Guernica.

Majd has also served as an advisor and translator for President Mohammad Khatami, and translator for President Mahmoud Ahmadinejad on their trips to the United States and to the United Nations, and he has written about those experiences.

Political views
Roland Elliott Brown writes in the British newspaper The Observer that "Majd's mild reformist agenda requires him to fight on two fronts" and that he has "honed his polemical skills by defending the nascent Islamic Republic to Iranian emigres at Speakers' Corner in London." adding that, in his opinion, Majd is "a sometimes sympathetic communicator of the regime's positions, and an enthusiast only for its most loyal oppositionists". Reviewing Majd's book The Ayatollahs' Democracy, Brown observes that Majd regards the administration as "increasingly fascistic": "flawed, capricious, but also popular, and a bulwark of sovereignty".

According to Newsweek, "Majd's Iran is a land where ayatollahs criticize each other and young people flout rules about wearing chadors. It's a land where Majd—who makes no secret of his admiration for the reformist President Mohammad Khatami—could go on to serve as the official translator for Khatami's successor and archrival, Mahmoud Ahmadinejad, when the latter visited New York in September. But Majd is no Iran apologist: he ridicules Ahmadinejad's officials for their Holocaust deniers' conference in 2006. Majd's subtle central point is that "the lack of meaningful relations between Iran and the United States … has brought little advantage to either nation."

Following the 2009 election in Iran, which he "concedes [...] fielded only regime-vetted candidates and was stolen".

Twitter controversies
In July 2012 a tweet from Majd's Twitter account was made about Iranian-born Nazanin Afshin-Jam, a human rights advocate and the wife of Canadian Defence Minister Peter MacKay. The tweet read: "Fucking a Canadian minister doesn’t make you Canadian, azizam. Come back to papa …" Majd has denied making it, and in a later public tweet directed at Afshin-Jam Majd said his account had been hacked: "@NazaninAJ A recent series of tweets were made in my name as a result of a hack. Not my words, and tweets have been removed." Before the tweet Afshin-Jam had been calling on the Canadian government and the Canadian Assembly of First Nations to cut diplomatic ties with the Islamic Republic of Iran. Afshin-Jam described the matter as serious but added that "unless I can verify exactly who sent it, I can't really comment."

In October 2013, Majd referred to Iranian-American writer Sohrab Ahmari, a Wall Street Journal (WSJ) assistant books editor as "WSJ's (Iranian) 'House Negro'" in a post on Twitter. Majd acknowledged the statement was an insult, but said he stood by it.

Publications

References

External links
 

1957 births
Living people
Iranian emigrants to the United States
People educated at St Paul's School, London
George Washington University School of Engineering and Applied Science alumni
Journalists from New York City